Union Station is a downtown neighborhood of Denver, Colorado. In 2020, the population of the neighborhood was roughly 5,878.

The neighborhood is named for Union Station, Denver's main railroad terminal. Much of the Lower Downtown Historic District (known as LoDo) is in the Union Station neighborhood, but the boundaries of the two are not the same, and LoDo is not one of the city's official statistical neighborhoods.

Boundaries
Northwest: South Platte River
Northeast: 20th Street
Southeast: Lawrence Street
Southwest: 14th Street (chiefly)

Redevelopment
As of 2019, that process has nearly been completed with the addition of a large number of apartments, a 334 unit condo complex, two grocery stores, and the now completed station.

Landmarks
The 16th Street Mall ends in the Union Station neighborhood. It then continues in a northwesterly direction towards the Highland neighborhood as a pedestrian route. This route includes three pedestrian bridges: Highland Bridge, Denver Millennium Bridge, and the Platte River Bridge.

The neighborhood is anchored by Union Station.

References

External links

Denver Union Station Master Plan and Process
Denver Union Station
River North Art District

Neighborhoods in Denver